Masterpieces: 1991–2002 is a greatest hits album released in September 2005 by Mustard Plug. It combines old songs with new recordings, without the use of a digital audio workstation. During the band's split up, they recorded this with some of their past members.

Track listing
"Beer (Song)" from Evildoers Beware
"Not Enough" from Yellow No. 5
"Someday, Right Now" from Pray for Mojo
"Mr. Smiley" from Big Daddy Multitude
"Lolita" from Pray for Mojo
"Go" from Evildoers Beware
"Just A Minute" from Yellow No. 5
"Throw A Bomb" from Pray for Mojo
"You" from Evildoers Beware
"Brain On Ska" from Skapocalypse Now
"In Your Face" from Yellow No. 5
"Everything Girl" from Pray for Mojo
"Box" from Evildoers Beware
"Yesterday" from Pray for Mojo
"Skank By Numbers" from Big Daddy Multitude
"Safe" from Yellow No. 5
"Mendoza" from Evildoers Beware
"We're Gunna Take On The World" from Pray for Mojo
"Thigh High Nylons" from Big Daddy Multitude
You (video ) 
Everything Girl (video)

References

External links

Masterpieces: 1991–2002 at YouTube (streamed copy where licensed)

Mustard Plug albums
2005 greatest hits albums
Hopeless Records compilation albums
Ska compilation albums
Punk rock compilation albums